Ercole Patti (16 February 1903 – 15 November 1976) was an Italian writer, dramatist, screenwriter and journalist.

Born in Catania into an upper-middle-class family, the nephew of author Giuseppe Villaroel, Patti started working as a journalist at very young age, before graduating in law in 1925. After practicing for a year in his father's firm, he decided to move to Rome where earning a living from journalism. There, after some sporadic collaborations, he was employed in the newspaper Gazzetta del Popolo, where he was a foreign correspondent in China, India and Japan, among other places. He got notoriety as a novelist in 1940, with Quartieri alti, a satirical portrait of Roman high classes. His novels are mainly set in Rome or in a sensual Sicily, which was, according to  literary critic Carlo Bo, a sort of philosophical ideal for Patti.

Patti was active as a screenwriter since 1935, and a number of his novels were adapted into films. In addition to novels Patti published collections of short stories and two autobiographical works.

Selected filmography
 But It's Nothing Serious (1936)
 A Woman Has Fallen (1941)
 That Splendid November (1969)
 La cugina (1974)

References

Further reading 
 Enzo Lauretta. Invito alla lettura di Ercole Patti. Mursia, 1975.
 Giovanni Scalia. I romanzi di Ercole Patti: saggi di psicocritica. Bonanno, 1982.
 Sarah Zappulla Muscarà. Ercole Patti. G. Maimone, 1989. .
 Pietro Frassica. Ercole Patti e altro Novecento siciliano. Interlinea Ed., 2004. .
 Sebastiano Gesù, Laura Maccarrone. Ercole Patti: un letterato al cinema. Maimone, 2004. .

1903 births
Writers from Catania
1976 deaths
Journalists from Catania
Italian male journalists
Italian dramatists and playwrights
20th-century Italian screenwriters
Italian male screenwriters
20th-century Italian novelists
20th-century Italian male writers
20th-century Italian dramatists and playwrights
Italian male novelists
Italian male dramatists and playwrights
20th-century Italian journalists